Melaleuca pearsonii, commonly known as Blackdown bottlebrush, is a plant in the myrtle family, Myrtaceae and is endemic to Queensland in Australia. (Some Australian state herbaria continue to use the name Callistemon pearsonii.) It is a small, spreading but compact shrub with hard bark, soft foliage and profuse spikes of bottlebrush flowers in spring and summer.

Description
The leaf veins are indistinct but there are many distinct oil glands.

The flowers are red, tipped with yellow and are arranged in short spikes on the ends of branches which continue to grow after flowering and also on the sides of the branches.

Taxonomy and naming
Melaleuca pearsonii was first named in 2006 by Lyndley Craven in Novon when Callistemon pearsonii was moved to the present genus. It had previously been known as Callistemon pearsonii, formally described by Roger Spencer and Peter Lumley in 1986 in Muelleria, based on plant material collected from the Blackdown Tabeland. The specific epithet (pearsonii) honours Steven Pearson, a park ranger in the Blackdown Tableland National Park.

Callistemon pearsonii is regarded as a synonym of Melaleuca pearsonii by the Royal Botanic Gardens, Kew.

Distribution and habitat
Melaleuca pearsonii occurs on the Blackdown Tableland in Queensland. It grows near rivers, in rocky gullies and in wallum vegetation in creek beds.

Use in horticulture
Melaleuca pearsonii is sometimes cultivated as Callistemon pearsonii including the cultivar "Rocky Rambler".

References

pearsonii
Flora of Queensland
Plants described in 1986